Admiral Ushakov is a 1953 Soviet historical war film directed by Mikhail Romm and starring Ivan Pereverzev, Boris Livanov and Sergei Bondarchuk.

The film portrays the career of Feodor Ushakov, a celebrated naval officer and contemporary of Horatio Nelson. It is followed by the sequel Attack from the Sea. The first part of the filmology, filmed in 1953 by the director Mikhail Romm with actor Ivan Pereverzev in the title role. The film is dedicated to the formation of the Russian fleet on the Black Sea.

History of creation 

The original version of the script was written by the historian-novelist Anatoly Vinogradov in 1944, during his stay at the front. In the credits of 
the film Vinogradov's surname is not indicated, however the script is listed 
in the official bibliography. He is also mentioned by Svyatoslav Belza in the preface to the three-volume collection of works.

The film was created on the initiative of the Soviet Navy (Vice Admiral Nikolai Kuznetsov) to declare the historical role of Admiral Ushakov in the history of the Russian fleet, since the approval of the Ushakov Order as the main naval order caused many questions in the USSR. In drawing up and correcting the scenario, the leading role was played by the leadership of the Navy and the Ministry of Foreign Affairs of the USSR (on foreign policy issues of the historical period). Filming was conducted in the fortress in Belgorod-Dnestrovsky.

In this film the actors Vladimir Etush (in the article about Etush specified another) and Gotlib Roninson (not shown in the credits) made their debut in film.

Plot 

The film takes place during the reign of Empress Catherine the Great.

1780 year. Captain of the Imperial yacht Fedor Ushakov asks the commander-in-chief Prince Grigori Potemkin directions to the Black Sea fleet under construction. For this he is ready to give up the prospect of a court career.

1783 year. With a small detachment of sailors and craftsmen Ushakov arrives in Kherson to shipyards. At this time, on the southern borders of Russia, the epidemic of plague rages, among the workers riots riot. Tikhon Prokofiev, nicknamed the Ragged Ear, the fugitive serf from the estate Ushakov and the ally of Pugachev, at the instigation of the English spy Orfano encourages the people to go to the Don. Ushakov with sailors stops the rebels, organizes the extinguishing of shipyards, set on fire by the same spy. Personal example convinces the chief local doctor Ermolaev to stay, attracts to his side Tikhon, introduces a strict quarantine regime and conquers the plague. Son of the doctor Ermolaev Victor asks Ushakov to enroll him on the ship, but he refuses but only because the ships are not yet.

1784 year. Simultaneously with the construction of the fleet, crews of ships begin training. During training firing Ushakov distracted arrived courier - Captain Senyavin. Between him and Ushakov immediately there is dislike. Meanwhile, Senyavin wanted to report that Potemkin himself had arrived at the ceremony of launching the ships. The head of the newly created Black Sea Admiralty board, the liberal and supporter of the British naval school, Count Mordovtsev, also informs Potemkin about the violations allowed by Ushakov the training of officers not according to statutes, unorthodox tactical ideas. Despite Ushakov's inappropriate behavior, Potemkin favored him, the potential of a talented naval commander. During the launching ceremony of the St. Pavel battleship Victor Ermolaev, despite protests from his mother, breaks into the ship. To Orfano in the meantime comes the messenger. The Spy finds Tikhon and reminds him that he can still betray him.

1786 year. During the first training voyage, Ushakov theoretically studies his ideas in the field of tactics of sea battles, while surprising officers by putting his forces into losing conditions - guided by the principle you want victory believe that the enemy is three times stronger, four times.

1787 year. Catherine II travels to Crimea. Potemkin is working on a scenario of events on this matter. Ushakov tells him that he can only boast of the increased training of personnel. Potemkin, despite external outrage, decides to surprise the empress and the ambassadors of European powers not with pomposity but with might. During the meeting of the empress, Potemkin first complains about the lack of strength, the actions of Turkish pirates using English and French weapons. The ambassadors of Great Britain and France ignore the statements. But then Potemkin demonstrates to the assembled squadron of the Black Sea fleet in the Sevastopol raid. At the signal Ushakov ships begin to show firing. However Ushakov, forgetting himself, cries out "Well done Vasiliev (Stapa St. Paul), all for a glass of vodka!". Despite this, the empress produces the commander of the squadron of Count Voinovich in the rear admirals, and Ushakov in brigadiers. London. The British government is concerned about the appearance of the Russian fleet on the Black Sea. Prime Minister William Pitt the Younger took an anti-Russian stance, in his own way understanding his father's will that Britain should not have competitors at sea. Exit Pitt finds in the declaration of Russia of war, but not by Britain, but by Turkey. The Turkish sultan orders the Russian ambassador to be imprisoned in the Semibashen Castle and to declare war on Russia. In the Crimea, the liaison officer informs Orfano about the beginning of the war. Simultaneously with the Turkish landing, the uprising of the Crimean Tatars, prepared by the British, should begin. The most urgent task of Orfano is to get rid of Ushakov. He requires Tikhon Prokofiev to kill Ushakov. However, he attacks the spy and beats him, but is forced to retire because of the newly appeared sailors. Orfano informs the Count Mordovtsev that Ushakov hides a runaway convict. Mordovtsev is on the ball, which gives Potemkin in order to report it. Potemkin, meanwhile, is discussing with Ushakov his ideas. Mordovtsev is going to report on Tikhon, but Senyavin appears that Turkey has declared war on Russia.

1788 year. The fleeing half of the Turkish fleet, defeated by the Ochakovs, and the Sevastopol squadron, which first went into battle, meet near the island of Fidonisi. Turks have a clear advantage in the forces 17 battleships against 2 Russian. However, the commander of the avant-garde (the 
battleship St. Paul, the frigates Berislav and Strela), the brigadier Ushakov is sure he will be able to achieve victory. He convinces the commander of the squadron Voinovich to allow him to act at his own discretion. The Rear Admiral permits and departs for the flagship. To Senyavin's request to allow him to stay on the ship, Ushakov refuses. Before the battle Tikhon confesses Ushakov that he fought Pugachev and is a runaway convict, but Ushakov closes his eyes and orders him to take his post. The avant-garde breaks away from the kordebatalia and begins a maneuver to reach the head of the Turkish line. Turks open fire, but erratic and with inefficient distance. Ushakov forbids shooting back, until the ships converge for a minimum distance. Turkish kapudan-pasha orders to prepare for boarding, however, converging, Russian ships open a shattering fire on the Turkish flagman. As a result of the maneuver of the frigates, the Turkish flagship is under fire from both sides. Voinovich, meanwhile, is only praying for "to 
leave the Turks without a shame." Senyavin informs him of Ushakov's daring maneuver. Despite the fact that Voinovich approves the maneuver with the strength of the result achieved, he himself prefers to stick to linear tactics, sends Senyavin and begins to pray for Ushakov's success. Senyavin arrives in the bid with a report for Potemkin, who, however, broke the spurt of the spleen. Using this, Mordovtsev tries to put him a denunciation of Ushakov allegedly he dissolves about Potemkin discrediting 
rumors. Potemkin is indifferent to the accusations of abuse of position, but 
the accusation of envy for the glory of Count Suvorov infuriates him. However, Senyavin again involuntarily saves Ushakov, reporting to Potemkin about the success of Fidonisi, which makes him forgive all the charges, stating that he needs a naval commander, not sabers and fiscals. Instead of denouncing him, he makes Mordovtsev write an order to confer Ushakov the title of Rear Admiral and appoint him commander of the Sevastopol squadron. Voinovich, he appoints the new chief of the Black Sea Admiralty Board, and Mordovtsev sends a long vacation, allegedly due to illness. Ushakov, taking command of the squadron, asks Voinovich permission to apply one more innovation reserve. Voinovich refuses, but declares that the correct decision will be to turn to Potemkin. Ushakov, on Voinovich's advice, declares to Potemkin that he came up with this idea, allegedly following his instructions. Potemkin understands that the idea belongs precisely to Ushakov and asks why he did this after all, the creator of this idea is proclaimed by Potemkin, not by him. Ushakov responds that he needs not glory, but the opportunity to beat the baking sheet

1790 year. In the battle of Tender, Ushakov defeated the Turkish fleet and 
seized the ship Meleki-Bahri. Those British Royal Navy officers who were on Turkish ships as observers report to the Admiralty about the tactics of Ushakov. Young officers Edward Foote and Horatio Nelson analyze the battle at Tender. Foot, 
like most British officers, sees Ushakov's violation of the rules only barbarity and savagery, but Nelson unravels in the barbarity innovative sea tactics. However, the intervening Admiral reminds Nelson, in case he ever 
commands the squadron, about the fate of Admiral Bing, who was shot for violating the regulations of the Admiralty. The Turkish sultan and his associates are discussing the situation. The Turkish fleet is defeated, despite the vows of advisers and the promises of the British. The Sultan asks 
his advisers what to expect next is it not that Ushak Pasha will open fire from the Bosporus in his palace. But the Admiral Seyid-Ali, who came from Algeria, reassures the Sultan. New ships arrived from the Mediterranean Sea 
faster and more powerful than Russians. In the bay of Kaliakria, you can not see water from many ships. Seid-Ali swears to the Sultan to bring Ushakov in a cage. Despite the confidence of his officers, Ushakov is seriously preparing for the upcoming battle.

1791. In the battle of Kaliakria, having passed under the fire of coastal batteries, the squadron in the marching order of three columns collapses into the Turkish fleet. During the battle, Ushakov's flagship draws close to the flagship of Seid-Ali. Ushakov notices the Turkish admiral and, knowing about the oath, shouts to him: Hey, Seyid-Ali is a slacker! I'll wean you, you son of a bitch, make promises to the Sultan!

The battle lasts until late at night and ends with the defeat of the Turkish fleet. Soon the war is over.

1792. However, after the death of Potemkin, Mordovtsev again becomes head of the Black Sea Admiralty Board. The Count is determined to bring his own orders to the fleet: ... the officer has a voice. The boatswain has a pipe. A sailor is only a subject for the execution of commands.

Ushakov, without entering into a dispute, before his eyes embraces his sailor Khovrin and retires to 
engage in a peaceful matter to complete the port of Sevastopol. The 
population of Sevastopol welcomes him as a hero.

Cast
 Ivan Pereverzev as Adm. Feodor Feodorovich Ushakov
 Boris Livanov as Prince Grigori Aleksandrovich Potemkin
 Sergei Bondarchuk as Tikhon Alekseevich Prokofiev
 Vladimir Druzhnikov as Midshipman Vasilyev
 Gennadi Yudin as Capt. Dmitri Nikolayevich Senyavin
 Vladimir Vasilyev as Sultan Eski Hassan
 Nikolai Svobodin as Mordovtsev
 Nikolai Chistyakov as Voinovich
 Mikhail Pugovkin as Pirozhkov
 Aleksey Alekseev as Metaksa
 Georgi Yumatov as Viktor Ermolaev
 Pavel Volkov as Medical Doctor Ermolaev
 Olga Zhiznyeva as Empress Catherine the Great
 Nikolai Khryashchikov as Khvorin, palace guard
 Nikolay Volkov as William Pitt
 Ivan Solovyov as Admiral Horatio Nelson
 Vladimir Etush as Capt. Said-Ali
 Pavel Shpringfeld as Shipbuilder Orfano
 Grigory Shpigel as Thomas Grey
 Lev Fenin as Robert Ansley 
 Pyotr Sobolevsky as English Ambassador
 Yan Yanakiyev as French Ambassador
 Georgy Georgiu as Turkish Ambassador
 Vyacheslav Gostinsky as Lanskoy
 Nikolay Kutuzov as General
 Viktor Kulakov as Korovin
 Pyotr Lyubeshkin as Lepekhin
 Vladimir Tumanov as Foot
 Galina Frolova as Maria Spiridonova
 Yelena Maksimova as Senyavinova
 Gotlib Roninson as Turkish man
 Emmanuil Geller as Turkish Admiral
 Vladimir Osenev as townsman
 Viktor Avdyushko as sailor
 Gleb Romanov as episode
 Sergey Solonitsky as German Ambassador
 Viktor Balashov as episode
 Andrei Fait as episode

Awards 

Diploma to the best foreign film at the Vichy Film Festival (1954).

Historicity 

Ushakov receives an appointment to the Black Sea Fleet (1783) immediately after his refusal to hold the post of captain of the imperial yacht, whereas after the yacht in 1780-1782 he was appointed to the Black Sea Fleet. was the commander of the battleship Victor, who participated in the policy of "armed neutrality" as part of the squadron in the Mediterranean.

Potemkin is depicted as devoid of the left eye, whereas in reality he did not see his right.

One of the main actors is the Count of the Mordovians, the president of the Black Sea Admiralty Board, at the time described, did not exist (obviously, N. Mordvinov is implied).

The Turkish Sultan is the same both at the beginning and at the end of the Russian-Turkish war of 1787-1791, whereas before 1789 the sultan was Abdul-Hamid I, and then his nephew Selim III.

The Turkish sultan accuses advisers of swearing that the sky will soon fall to the ground and the waters of the Danube will flow backward than its fleet will be defeated. In reality, this phrase was the answer of the chief of the fortress Ismail Aidozle-Mehmet Pasha to the ultimatum of Suvorov before the assault.

In the offscreen commentary, it is said about Ushakov's victory at Sinop, which, as we know, was won not by him, but by PS Nakhimov. Perhaps, the actions of the Black Sea Fleet are considered from the Turkish coast in 1789-1790, when a blow was struck on a number of Turkish ports, including Sinop.

After the capture of Ishmael, it was the strong fleet that remained the last hope of the Ottoman Empire, so the references to the "broken fleet" are rather strange.

Captured in battle at Tender, the Turkish battleship "Meleki-Bahri" is depicted as three-deck (that is, carrying at least 90 guns), whereas in reality it was a two-year 66-gun ship. In addition, Meleki-Bahri was captured by the battleship Mary Magdalene, and not by St. Paul. The film refers to several ships captured at Tender, and on the screen show the line ships, and one was seized, "Meleki-Bahri".

In the battle of Fidonisi, Voinovich's ship The Transfiguration of the Lord won a battle with two ships of the Turkish Vice and Rear Admiral and sank the Turkish Shebek, while in the film the whole battle was led by Ushakov with the vanguard, and Voinovich only prayed.

Mark Voinovich is shown by a man of advanced age, in fact at the time being described he was about 40 years old, moreover, he was five years younger than Ushakov. NK Svobodin, who played Mordovtsev, was 55 years old, whereas his prototype Mordvinov, even in 1791, when the film ends, is 37 years old.

The flagship ship Ushakov during the whole film is the 66-gun "St. Paul", whereas already in the first "independent" battle in the Kerch Strait, his flagship was the 84-gun "Christmas of Christ".

The battle of Kaliakria is shown as a decisive rout of the Turkish fleet, although the Turks did not lose a single ship and were able to leave thanks to the constructive superiority of their ships. However, the Turkish fleet was strongly disorganized - most of the ships scattered along the Rumeli coast, having received damage of varying degrees. The Turkish flagship sank, having already reached Constantinople, which made a heavy impression on the inhabitants of the capital of the Ottoman Empire.

References

Bibliography 
 Rollberg, Peter. Historical Dictionary of Russian and Soviet Cinema. Scarecrow Press, 2008.

External links 
 

1950s war drama films
Soviet war drama films
Russian war drama films
1950s biographical drama films
Soviet biographical drama films
Russian biographical drama films
1950s historical drama films
Soviet historical drama films
Russian historical drama films
Mosfilm films
1950s Russian-language films
Films directed by Mikhail Romm
Films set in the 18th century
Films set in the 19th century
Seafaring films
Cultural depictions of Catherine the Great
Cultural depictions of William Pitt the Younger
Films about the Russian Empire
Films scored by Aram Khachaturian
Films set in Crimea
Films set in Istanbul
Films set in Saint Petersburg
Films set in London
Films set in 1780
Films set in 1783
Films set in 1784
Films set in 1786
Films set in 1787
Films set in 1788
Films set in 1790
Films set in 1791
Films set in 1792
Cultural depictions of Horatio Nelson
Films shot in Russia
Soviet epic films